I Blow Minds for a Living is the third spoken word album by Jello Biafra.

Track listing
Disc 1

Disc 2

References

1991 albums
Alternative Tentacles albums
Jello Biafra albums
Spoken word albums by American artists